Martin Henson (born 1952) is an English landscape photographer, best known for his Black and white pinhole images. He specializes in black and white landscapes.

Early life 
Martin was born to parents Betty and Stephen. At the age of 12, Martin's passion for photography began. Martin Henson's first camera was bought for him when he was 12 years old. It was a Kodak 120 roll film.

References

English photographers
+Photographers
1952 births
20th-century British photographers
21st-century British photographers
Landscape photographers
Living people
Fine art photographers
Photographers from Yorkshire